Carter may refer to the following communities in Wisconsin:
Carter, Forest County, Wisconsin, an unincorporated community
Carter, Iron County, Wisconsin, an unincorporated community